RF7 is an American, long-lived, southern California punk rock band, that began in 1979 by Felix Alanis and small-time child star of the Sheriff John show Nick Lamagna. Felix also began the record label Smoke Seven Records and signed his band and many others who were ignored by the big labels then, such as Redd Kross, Bad Religion, JFA, Crank Shaft, Circle One, SIN 34, Youth Gone Mad, etc.

From the beginning, the RF7 sound was not clearly punk but really what would be called today hardcore punk. Felix Alanis has always mixed middle class virtues with strange religious imagery in his lyrics. Nick Lamagna added guitar and music that had a twist more "rock" than some punks preferred. Walt Phelan added a drummer's drumming, and the bass player seemed to always change, with Robert Armstrong perhaps being the most solid recorded bass man from 1980–83, and again on 1990s classic Traditional Values album. On 1982's Fall In album, the band brought in the record producer, Geza X. 

The band continues today with their 2004 release, Addictions and Heartaches, on the Puke and Vomit label, which also re-released the compilation albums Public Service and Sudden Death compilation. Their early releases are available on the Grand Theft Audio label, as well as Bomp and Alive records.

Discography

Studio albums
 1979 – Acts of Defiance
 1981 – Weight of the World
 1982 – Fall In (EP)
 1983 – Submit to Them Freely (EP)
 1987 – RF7 87
 1989 – Traditional Values
 1994 – Satan VS The Working Man
 1997 – God Forbid
 2004 – Addictions and Heart Aches
 2007 – Left for Dead (45)
 2009 – Hatred on the Rise
 2011 – God Forbid
 2014 – 101
 2017 – Day at the Crisis

Compilation albums
 1981 – Public Service
 1982 – Lung Cookies
 19?? – Sudden Death
 1995 – Buried Alive / Smoke 7 Records 81-83 (Bomp Records #BCD 4052)
 1996 – Buried Alive 2] (Bomp Records #BCD 4058)

Band members 1979 - 2009
 Felix Alanis, Vocals
 Nick Lamagna, Guitars
 Joe Rowan, Bass Guitar
 Robert Armstrong, Bass,
 Gnat, Bass
 Mike Smith, Bass
 Kiley Asato, Bass
 Xavier Chavez, Bass
 Walt Phelan, Drums
 Big Mike, Drums
 Steve Drojensky (Dorant), Auxiliary Guitar(Fall In/Submit to Them Freely)
 Tony Calderone, Guitar

External links
 RF7 Website
 Interview on Scanner Zine

Musical groups established in 1979
Hardcore punk groups from California